The 1958 Kentucky Derby was the 84th running of the Kentucky Derby. The race took place on May 3, 1958.

Full results

 Winning breeder: Calumet Farm (KY)

References

1958
Kentucky Derby
Derby
Kentucky
Kentucky Derby